Richard "Dicky" Johnson Bolles (August 1, 1843 – March 25, 1917) was one of Florida's many early land salesmen. He was also one of the first to market the land in small tracts to would be future residents. Born on August 1, 1843, in 1908 Bolles purchased  of undeveloped land from the state of Florida at the price of two dollars an acre. He went on to sell this land, sight unseen to unknowing non-residents. His salesmanship was ultimately a scam and in 1911 those who were caught up in it brought suit against him. Later in 1913 he was indicted and arrested, though later found innocent. Bolles died on March 25, 1917, at the age of 73.

References
 http://everglades.fiu.edu/reclaim/bios/bolles.htm
 Up for Grabs, John Rothchild, 1985

1843 births
1917 deaths
Businesspeople from Florida
19th-century American businesspeople